Robb Gordon (born January 13, 1976) is a Canadian retired professional ice hockey centre who played briefly in the National Hockey League for the Vancouver Canucks. Selected by the Canucks in the 1994 NHL Entry Draft, he played four games for the team in the 1998–99 season, spending the rest of his career in the minor leagues before retiring in 2000. Internationally Gordon played for the Canadian national junior team at the 1996 World Junior Championships, winning a gold medal.

Playing career

Gordon was born in Murrayville, British Columbia and raised in Surrey, British Columbia. He was selected in the second round (39th overall) of the 1994 NHL Entry Draft by the Vancouver Canucks following a season in the BCHL with the Powell River Paper Kings. He played college hockey for the Michigan Wolverines alongside future NHL players such as John Madden, Brendan Morrison, and Mike Knuble. After his freshman season, he left the Wolverines and played in the Western Hockey League for the Kelowna Rockets, where he scored 114 points in 58 games. He would play for Canada at the 1996 World Junior Championships, winning a gold medal.

Gordon experienced a difficult transition to professional hockey, in large part due to his sub-par skating. He would score 25 points in 63 games for the Syracuse Crunch, Vancouver's AHL affiliate in 1996–97, and was at one point sent down to the ECHL. The following season, he would record 10 points in 40 games. He was called up to the Canucks in the 1998–99 season, playing four games for the team, whi scoring 16 goals and 38 points for Syracuse. However, he was released by Vancouver the following season. Following his release by the Canucks, Gordon spent a season in the International Hockey League with the Long Beach Ice Dogs, recording 18 points in 50 games, and retired in 2000.

Career statistics

Regular season and playoffs

International

Awards and honours

External links

1976 births
Living people
Canadian ice hockey centres
Ice hockey people from British Columbia
Kelowna Rockets players
Long Beach Ice Dogs (IHL) players
Michigan Wolverines men's ice hockey players
People from Langley, British Columbia (district municipality)
Raleigh IceCaps players
Sportspeople from Surrey, British Columbia
Syracuse Crunch players
Vancouver Canucks draft picks
Vancouver Canucks players